The 2015 British Speedway Championship is the 55th edition of the British Speedway Championship. Tai Woffinden was the defending champion having won the title in 2013 and 2014. The competition consisted of two semi-finals and a final. Seven riders qualified from each semi-final and were joined by two nominated wildcards in the decider. The final took place in Wolverhampton on 15 June 2015 and was won by Woffinden. It was his third straight success, equalling the feat achieved by Andy Smith between 1993 and 1995. Craig Cook was second for the second year in a row, earning himself the wildcard place in the 2015 Speedway Grand Prix of Great Britain as a result. Cook had initially led the final, but Jason Garrity fell and a re-run was then required, which Woffinden won. Danny King took third place overall.

Results

Semi-Final 1 
 Sheffield
 7 May 2015

Semi-Final 2 
 King's Lynn
 20 May 2015

The Final 
 Monmore Green Stadium, Wolverhampton
 15 June 2015

See also 
 British Speedway Championship

References 

British Speedway Championship
Great Britain